John Holmes (1763-1836) was a planter and slave-owner in Jamaica. He was elected to the House of Assembly of Jamaica in 1820.

References 

Members of the House of Assembly of Jamaica
1763 births
1836 deaths
British slave owners
18th-century British businesspeople
18th-century Jamaican people
19th-century British businesspeople
19th-century Jamaican people
Magistrates
Churchwardens
Planters of Jamaica